Relayer is the seventh studio album by the English progressive rock band Yes, released in November 1974 by Atlantic Records. After keyboardist Rick Wakeman left the group in May 1974 over disagreements with the band's direction following their double concept album Tales from Topographic Oceans (1973), Yes entered rehearsals as a four-piece in Buckinghamshire. They auditioned several musicians, including Greek keyboardist and composer Vangelis, before settling with Swiss musician Patrick Moraz of Refugee who incorporated elements of funk and jazz fusion to the album. Relayer is formed of three tracks, with "The Gates of Delirium" on side one and "Sound Chaser" and "To Be Over" on side two.

Relayer received a mixed to positive reception from contemporary and retrospective critics. It reached No. 4 on the UK Albums Chart and No. 5 on the US Billboard 200. A single of the closing section of "The Gates of Delirium", titled "Soon", was released in January 1975. After touring in support of the album between November 1974 and July 1975, Yes went on a year-long hiatus. Relayer continued to sell, and is certified gold by the Recording Industry Association of America (RIAA) for selling over 500,000 copies in the US. It was remastered in 2003 and in 2014, both with previously unreleased tracks; the latter includes new stereo and 5.1 surround sound mixes and additional tracks.

Background
In April 1974, the Yes line-up of singer Jon Anderson, bassist Chris Squire, guitarist Steve Howe, keyboardist Rick Wakeman, and drummer Alan White wrapped their 1973–1974 tour in support of their previous album, Tales from Topographic Oceans (1973). The album had been a success for the band, reaching number one in the UK for two weeks, and became the first to be certified gold by the British Phonographic Industry based solely on pre-orders. Despite the group's success, during recording, Wakeman informed the band of his decision to leave at its conclusion following his disagreements and frustration with the direction the band had taken with the album, with its esoteric concept and its double length which he believed caused the material to suffer as a result. Wakeman confirmed his departure in May 1974, and the news was made public on 8 June.

Reduced to a four-piece, Yes retreated to Farmyard Studios, owned by drummer Trevor Morais, in Little Chalfont, Buckinghamshire, and started working on new songs. After some material had been written, auditions for a new keyboardist began which involved about eight players, including Jean Roussel, Eddie Jobson, Nick Glennie-Smith of Wally, and Greek musician and composer Vangelis. Others were flown in from the US and Germany. Anderson had become a fan of Vangelis and visited his Paris flat when Yes were in town performing Tales from Topographic Oceans. Vangelis agreed to an audition, but Yes found he was non-committal to the role and too strong a personality for a group. Phil Carson, an Atlantic Records manager and associate of the band, said that Vangelis "tried out Yes but it didn't really gel ... Vangelis wouldn't get on a plane and wouldn't fly anywhere and Yes were about to go on tour." The possibility of Vangelis joining the band was also affected by a rejection from the Musicians Union. Soon after, Melody Maker reporter and band biographer Chris Welch suggested that the band try Patrick Moraz, a Swiss musician and film composer with a background in jazz and classical music, and a member of the progressive and jazz fusion trio Refugee. Less than a week later, Moraz accepted an invitation from Brian Lane, the band's manager, to an audition. Moraz was a fan of the band and had previously met them during their tour of Switzerland in 1969.

Moraz auditioned with Yes during the first week of August 1974. He arrived at Farmyard Studios early and saw each member arrive in his own expensive car. He said: "Coming from Refugee, where we had been walking three miles to and from our rehearsal place ... it was quite a contrast!" Moraz auditioned with Vangelis's keyboards, which were still situated in the studio. After tuning up, he played some parts to display his ability, including a short section of "And You and I" from Close to the Edge (1972), causing the band to stop talking and gather around him. Moraz's first task was to devise a section to complement what they had written for the middle section of "Sound Chaser". The band liked what Moraz had played, and the following day, Lane informed him that Yes wished for him to join full-time. Moraz felt some pressure to deliver, and drove from his flat in Earl's Court, near central London to the studio each day to record.

Recording

Relayer was recorded at Squire's home named New Pipers in Virginia Water, Surrey, which he had purchased in Christmas 1972, and converted his garage into a recording studio. This marked the first time Yes had made an album outside of London, and the location saved the group money as they no longer needed to pay for time in a professional studio which allowed them to concentrate their efforts on the music. It is their last album of the 1970s to feature Eddy Offord as co-producer before he left to work with other bands. Having worked with Yes as their producer, engineer, and live sound mixer since 1970, Offord later stated that his time with the group had become "a bit stale" by the time of Relayer. As Squire's studio did not yet have the right equipment to record, Offord set up a 24-track recording machine and mixing desk using his own mobile equipment, and had Gennaro Rippo as tape operator. The album's production duties were shared by Offord and the group. After the album was recorded, it was mixed at Advision Studios in London.

Having made Tales from Topographic Oceans, a double concept album, Yes scaled back their output and presented Relayer as a single album with a structure similar to Close to the Edge, with one track occupying side one and two tracks on side two. According to Anderson, the band wrote two additional tracks during the album's sessions but did not have enough time to record them. He described one of them as "absolutely crazy and intricate". For the majority of his parts recorded for the album, Moraz did not write the music on paper and instead relied on his memory except for some particularly precise sections. Recording sessions would last for as long as eight or nine hours.

Howe uses a 1955 Fender Telecaster on Relayer, marking a departure from his Gibson ES-175 that he had used since The Yes Album (1971). He also uses a pedal steel guitar. Squire uses a Fender Jazz Bass on "To Be Over". Moraz uses a number of keyboards that are not found on other Yes albums.

Songs

Side one
"The Gates of Delirium" is a 22-minute track that Anderson described as "a war song, a battle scene, but it's not to explain war or denounce it ... There's a prelude, a charge, a victory tune, and peace at the end, with hope for the future." Anderson had originally planned to have the entire album based on War and Peace by Leo Tolstoy, but instead had a side-long track inspired by the novel. Moraz recalled discussing War and Peace with Anderson, as they had both read the book, after which Moraz showed Anderson a copy of the French science fiction comic Delirius by Philippe Druillet. Moraz said, "He related to it immediately so I think that perhaps as a title 'The Gates of Delirium' came from that". The song originated from an idea that Anderson had come up with and played to the group on the piano "very badly", so he was relieved when his bandmates understood what he was trying to do. Anderson and Howe kept track of its structure by recording sections of it on cassette tapes, leaving Anderson to figure out the next part as the group would develop what was put down prior. The song was recorded in sections at a time, though the group was familiar with the entire piece beforehand and spent several weeks recording takes of each section and selecting the ones the members felt were the strongest. Once picked, the sections were edited together and overdubs were then recorded. The battle section includes crashing sound effects that were created by White pushing over a tower of used car parts that he and Anderson had collected from a scrap yard. Howe remembered Anderson becoming too excited in what he envisaged the battle to be, leading the group to produce one mix that was "too far gone" and another "too safe". Following the battle, the track concludes with a gentle song that later became known as "Soon". Anderson later thought that the song did not come across effectively on record, but fared better in concert.

Side two
"Sound Chaser" displays Yes' experiment with jazz fusion and funk influences. During Moraz's audition session with the band, he was asked to play an introduction to the song, which was recorded and used on the album after "one or two takes". He has called his Moog synthesizer solo at the end of the track a highlight moment but felt that the keyboards on the rest of the album were buried in the final mix. Howe thought the track was "an indescribable mixture of Patrick's jazzy keyboards and my weird sort of flamenco electric [guitar]", yet he disliked Moraz's initial choice of chords he played during his guitar solo, causing Moraz to play it differently, which he disagreed with. Band biographer Dan Hedges compared the track to the style of fusion group Return to Forever.

"To Be Over" originated when Anderson spent an afternoon at Howe's house in London. As the two discussed what music to prepare for the album, Anderson told Howe of his fondness for a melody Howe had written and had sung to Anderson before. Anderson also had the initial lyric: "We'll go sailing down the stream tomorrow, floating down the universal stream, to be over". Howe gained inspiration for the track from a boat ride on The Serpentine lake in Hyde Park in London. From the beginning, he thought the song was "really special" and Anderson agreed to develop it further. Howe had come up with the music for this particular section in the late 1960s and took a riff from a track by his earlier group, Tomorrow. Anderson described "To Be Over" as "Strong in content, but mellow in overall attitude ... It's about how you should look after yourself when things go wrong." When the song's lyric was being finalised, Howe suggested having the line "She won't know what it means to me" follow "We go sailing down the calming streams", but Anderson changed it to "To be over, we will see", a change that Howe thought was "creatively disguised" to make a broader lyrical statement. Moraz felt constricted to perform an improvised keyboard solo for the song, so he wrote down a counterpoint solo "exactly like a classical fugue" to blend his keyboards with the guitar and bass. He had written an initial version on paper in an evening, yet the band expressed their wish to change the key of the song for the section, causing Moraz to spend several hours rewriting it overnight.

Artwork
The album's sleeve was designed and illustrated by English artist Roger Dean, who had designed artwork for the band since 1971, including their logo. In his 1975 book Views, Dean picked the cover as his favourite for Yes, and the recording he enjoyed the most. He revealed his intention of depicting "a giant 'gothic' cave" for the sleeve, "a sort of fortified city for military monks". The painting originated from a watercolour sketch Dean had done while studying in college. Speaking about the cover in 2004, he said: "I was playing with the ideas of the ultimate castle, the ultimate wall of a fortified city. That was more of a fantastical idea. I was looking for the kinds of things like the Knights Templar would have made or what you'd see in the current movie Lord of the Rings. The curving, swirling cantilevers right into space." The images depicted in many of Dean's album covers set an otherworldly tone and are an identifiable part of the band's visual style. For Relayer, the warriors on horseback reflect the lyrical themes of war present in "The Gates of Delirium". The sleeve includes an untitled four-stanza poem by writer Donald Lehmkuhl dated October 1974, and features a band photograph taken by Moraz's former Mainhorse bandmate, Jean Ristori. The album's CD reissue features two additional paintings, and further unused designs are included in Dean's 2008 book Dragon's Dream. At the 1975 edition of the NME Awards, the album won Best Dressed LP.

Dean has said that "The Gates of Delirium" may be his favourite Yes track and that he felt the album should have been named after it. By 2020, the painting had been on sale for $6 million.

Release
Relayer was released in the UK in November 1974 on LP, audio cassette, and 8-track tape, followed by its release in the US on 5 December 1974. It continued the band's commercial success during the 1970s, reaching number 4 on the UK Albums Chart and number 5 on the US Billboard Top LPs chart. Less than two weeks after its release in the US, the album reached gold certification by the Recording Industry Association of America on 18 December 1974 for over 500,000 copies sold. A single of the closing section of "The Gates of Delirium", titled "Soon" (From "The Gates of Delirium"), was released as a single on 8 January 1975, with an edited version of "Sound Chaser" on its B-side.

Reception

Critical reception

Relayer received a mostly positive reaction from music critics. Music journalist and author Chris Welch gave a positive review for Melody Maker, praising the album as "one of the most successful and satisfying Yes albums". He described "The Gates of Delirium" as a "powerful piece ... and benefits by the time structures imposed by this single album." Welch continued to note the band "at their best, creating tension and release with consummate ease, and preparing the way for Jon's crystalline vocals" at the end of the battle section which segues into "Soon". In its December 1974 review, Billboard magazine called Relayer "another nearly flawless effort" by Yes and noted Moraz "fits in perfectly". It concluded with "one of the simpler, yet at the same time, one of the most workable sets the band has come up with." Those who gave the album a negative review thought it was the follow-up to Tales from Topographic Oceans (1973), an album they felt was pretentious and overblown.

In a retrospective review, AllMusic rated the album three stars out of five, stating Yes had "little incentive to curb their musical ambitiousness" at the time, the album "alternated abrasive, rhythmically dense instrumental sections featuring solos for the various instruments with delicate vocal and choral sections featuring poetic lyrics devoted to spiritual imagery."

The band
Howe described the music on Relayer as "very modern, European style of music, and Patrick brought in a South American flavour as well. It was a very international record". Squire thought some of the interaction between his bass and White's drums was better than anything heard on previous Yes albums at that point. Moraz summarised the album's recording as "pretty loose, but the energy is there". Upon its release, Wakeman was asked to review it for the BBC and felt pleased that the band had made it as it was "far too jazzy and freeform, which I didn't like". Had the group recorded music more melodic and thematic, he would have felt angry as it would have been the direction that he thought Yes should have adopted. "I'm pleased I made the right decision to leave the band when I did".

Reissues
Relayer was first reissued on CD in 1988 on the Atlantic in Europe and the US. The CD mastering has been attributed to Zal Schreiber, one of Atlantic's in-house CD mastering engineers at the time. In 1998, a mini-sleeve HDCD version mastered by Isao Kikuchi was released in Japan .  In 2003, the album was digitally remastered on Rhino and Elektra Records by George Marino at Sterling Sound.  This version included single edits of "Soon" and "Sound Chaser" and a studio run-through of "The Gates of Delirium" with less keyboards and alternate song structures in parts but an identical "battle" section as heard in the final version. 2009 saw the album remastered by Isao Kikuchi for the Japanese market. The 2003 remastered edition was included in the band's The Studio Albums 1969–1987 box set, released in 2013.

In November 2014, Relayer was reissued as CD/DVD-Audio and CD/Blu-ray disc packs on the Panegyric label with new stereo and 5.1 surround sound mixes by Steven Wilson. The packs feature bonus tracks including an original master transfer and studio run-through versions of each track. The Blu-ray pack includes an instrumental mix of the album. This remaster does not include the sound effects heard in the middle section of "The Gates of Delirium" as they were not part of the original multi-track masters. Wilson hypothesised that they were added during the final mixdown of the album from a separate tape source.

Live performances

Relayer Tour
Yes supported Relayer with their 1974–1975 tour of North America and the UK that lasted from 8 November 1974 to 23 August 1975, with the album played in its entirety. The tour culminated with a headline spot at the 1975 Reading Festival. Most dates featured the English band Gryphon as the opening act. Rehearsals lasted for several weeks at Shepperton Studios, Surrey with Offord on sound, stage lighting by their longtime associate Michael Tait, and the set designed by Roger Dean and his brother Martyn.

The tour opened with a 31-date leg of the US, for which Moraz had about six weeks to familiarise himself with the setlist and made use of his 90-minute drive from his London flat to Squire's home to learn it. Ristori assisted by transcribing Yes songs onto paper, forming what Moraz described as "memory sheets", because of the amount and the complexity of some of his parts. He relied on the sheets for the first few shows on the tour, yet by the time the tour reached Madison Square Garden in New York City less than two weeks later, Moraz realised he had learned the set and stopped using them. The show was a highlight for him: "We had a standing ovation for several minutes. The noise was absolutely unbelievable." His rig included 14 keyboards on stage, double the number he had previously worked with. Future Yes singer and producer Trevor Horn, a fan of the band, attended their show on the UK leg and recalled the performance of "The Gates of Delirium": "It got to the end and Jon sang 'Soon' ... I felt like crying. It got me so much. I loved that song so much". Yes took an extended hiatus after the tour for each member to produce a solo album.

2023 Album Series Tour
Yes originally planned to conduct a European tour in 2020 that continued their Album Series Tour and featured Relayer performed in its entirety. In March 2020, both tours were postponed due to the COVID-19 pandemic. On 23 March 2021, Yes announced that the Relayer tour would be postponed yet again and rescheduled for 2022. By March 2022, the band announced that they would instead dedicate the UK and Ireland leg of the tour to their album Close to the Edge in honor of the 50th anniversary of its release. The UK dates were eventually scheduled for June 2023.

Track listing

All tracks written by Yes.

Notes:
Track durations are absent on the original UK vinyl, but were included on North American pressings.
"Soon" is credited solely to Jon Anderson per BMI records. However, the track is credited to Yes as a whole on both the original single and the 2003 remaster of the album.

Personnel
Credits are adapted from the 1974 album liner notes.

Yes
Jon Anderson – lead vocals, acoustic guitars, piccolo, percussion
Steve Howe – acoustic and electric guitars, pedal steel, electric sitar, backing vocals
Chris Squire – bass guitar, backing vocals 
Patrick Moraz – piano, electric piano, Hammond organ, Minimoog, Mellotron
Alan White – drums, percussion

Production
Eddie Offord – engineer, production
Yes – production
Gennaro Rippo – tape operator
Roger Dean – cover design and drawing
Mike Allinson – paste up
Brian Lane – co-ordinator (band manager)
Jean Ristori – original group photograph
Mansell Litho – plates

Charts

Certifications

References
Notes

Footnotes

Sources

External links
Official Yes website at YesWorld

Yes (band) albums
Albums with cover art by Roger Dean (artist)
1974 albums
Albums produced by Eddy Offord
Atlantic Records albums